Berkeley Hall School (BHS) is a coed independent school for Nursery through eighth grades located on 66 acres off Mulholland Drive near the 405 Freeway in Los Angeles, California, US. The school is accredited by the California Association of Independent Schools (CAIS)  and the Western Association of Schools & Colleges (WASC).

History and background
Berkeley Hall was founded in 1911 by educators Leila and Mabel Cooper. Leila Cooper was a popular teacher at the Westlake School for Girls before leaving to open her own school at the urging of Westlake parents. Both Leila and Mabel Cooper were Christian Scientists. According to its website, it is currently nonsectarian and does not teach religion, and says it is committed to its "founding values" in its approach to education. In earlier years, students and their families were expected to practice the religion of Christian Science. Today, they are diverse community in which all religious backgrounds are welcome.

Berkeley Hall School was the first coed independent elementary school in Los Angeles. The other existing private schools – Harvard School (boys), Westlake School (girls) and Marlborough School (girls) – were single-sex.

Berkeley Hall was named after Berkeley Square, the first gated community on the West Coast. It was across the street from the school's first campus which was located in what is now the historic West Adams district. The area was marked by tree-lined, upper-class neighborhoods, linked to downtown by electric streetcars.

In 1913, the school moved to a larger facility on 4th Avenue in the same district. Ten years later, a committee of parents and friends began searching for a new location that could accommodate an expanding enrollment. The committee secured money from 20 families to purchase a 70-acre farm known as the Rodeo Land and Water Co. in the village of Beverly Hills. 77 acres were purchased that included lots on Wilshire Blvd to the north to Burton Way and from Doheny to Clark Drive. Parents began subdividing & selling the lots and saved 10 acres for the school.

In 1925, Berkeley Hall School moved to its Swall Drive campus in Beverly Hills where it remained for 51 years.

In 1976, the school purchased its current 66-acre campus on Mulholland Drive. In the fall of 1980, Berkeley Hall School opened its doors to serve both the Westside of Los Angeles and the San Fernando Valley.

Current tuition is about $39,480/year.

Administration
The Head of School since 2021 is Dr. Nikki Gamrath.

References

External links

Schools in Los Angeles County, California
1911 establishments in California
Educational institutions established in 1911